Khalil Ahmad Qureshi (Urdu: خليل احمد قريشى; HI, SI), is a Pakistani physical chemist and the professor of physical chemistry at the Punjab University. He has published notable papers in nuclear physical chemistry in international scientific journals as well contributing in the advancement of the scientific applications of the civilian usage of the fuel cycle.

Biography

Early life and education
A native of Lahore, Qureshi subsequently attended the Punjab University to study chemistry where he graduated with BSc in chemistry. For his higher studies, he went to United Kingdom to attend Imperial College London. He earned MSc in Chemical Technology and worked towards gaining the DIC in physical metallurgy. At the Imperial College, he joined the doctoral group led by Thomas West and David Craig. He earned his PhD in physical chemistry under the supervision of David Craig, writing his thesis on Physico-chemical studies of the vapour deposition of Al2O3, in 1972.

Pakistan Atomic Energy Commission
He briefly taught physical chemistry at the London University before moving to Pakistan. Upon his return, he joined the Pakistan Atomic Energy Commission (PAEC) and took the professorship of nuclear chemistry at the Pakistan Institute of Nuclear Science and Technology (PINSTECH). Subsequently, he joined the clandestine atomic bomb project's chemistry section led by fellow chemist IH Qureshi. Munir Ahmad Khan, chairman PAEC, had him to partially take over the "R-Labs" at PAEC to engage research in chemical explosives. Initially, the research was concentrated towards development of the HMX, a non-toxic explosive that was produced as a by-product of the RDX process. In the 1970s, he founded the Metallurgical Laboratory (Met Lab) where he also moved majority of the staff to undertake research in physical metallurgy.

At the Met Lab, Qureshi led the team of physical chemists who supervised the physical conversion of UF6 into solid metal before coating and machining the metal. During this time, he supervised and led the research on using chemical and metallurgical industrial techniques and reduction furnaces to produce metal from the HEC which moved from KRL. Due to the sensitivity of the project and concerns of fellow theorist AQ Khan, the program was definitely moved to KRL in the 1980s.

Research and science activism
While at PAEC, Qureshi joined the chemistry department of Quaid-e-Azam University as an associate professor. In the 1990s, he joined the Punjab University to teach post-graduate course on physical chemistry. In the 2000s, he joined the Lahore University of Management Sciences's School of Science and Engineering as director of engineering and safety.

Over the years, he became known for his strong scientific advocacy of peaceful usage of nuclear energy, safety, and security, following the Fukushima disaster. A member of Khwarizmi Science Society, he has lectured on safety issues regarded the nuclear power and topics in nuclear chemistry. He has also authored numerous articles on chemical safety and securities around the world in world's leading research journal. In 2011, he lectured on physical chemistry and spoke about how nuclear technology was being used currently and different ways of disposing nuclear waste at the Forman Christian College University in Lahore. He is the recipient of Pakistan's highest honours– the Hilal-i-Imtiaz bestowed in 2003 and the Sitara-e-Imtiaz bestowed in 1999 by the Government of Pakistan.

Honors and recognition

Hilal-i-Imtiaz (2003)
Sitara-e-Imtiaz (1999)
 President, Pakistan Materials Research Society
Fellow, Pakistan Institute of Metallurgical Engineers 
Fellow of Pakistan Nuclear Society

References

External links
Harnessing Nuclear Energy

Living people
Scientists from Lahore
University of the Punjab alumni
Alumni of Imperial College London
Academic staff of Lahore University of Management Sciences
Academics of the University of London
Academic staff of the University of the Punjab
Academic staff of Quaid-i-Azam University
Pakistani chemical engineers
Project-706
Physical chemists
Pakistani science writers
Recipients of Hilal-i-Imtiaz
Recipients of Sitara-i-Imtiaz
Year of birth missing (living people)
Nuclear weapons scientists and engineers